The 1947 European Amateur Boxing Championships were held in the National Stadium, Dublin, Ireland from 2 to 17 May. It was the seventh edition of the bi-annual competition was organised by the European governing body for amateur boxing, EABA and the second consecutive European Championship held in Ireland with the other championship being held before the break during World War II in the 1939 Games.

Medal winners

Medal table

External links
EABA Boxing

European Amateur Boxing Championships
Boxing
European Amateur Boxing Championships
International boxing competitions hosted by Ireland
Boxing in County Dublin
Box
Boxing Championships
1940s in Dublin (city)